Thomas S. Wootton High School or Wootton High School (WHS) is a public high school in Rockville, Maryland. Its namesake is Thomas S. Wootton, the founder of Montgomery County. The school was founded in 1970 and is part of the Montgomery County Public Schools system. Robert Frost Middle School along with half of Cabin John Middle School feed into the school. In 2019, Newsweek ranked Wootton's STEM program #160 in a nationwide survey of US high schools. In 2022, U.S. News & World Report ranked Wootton #167 nationally amongst high school.

History

In November 2001, President George W. Bush visited Wootton and signed the congressional bill officially recognizing "Veterans Awareness Week", which takes place the week before Veteran's Day.

In 2015, school principal Michael Doran was found dead in his Bethesda, Maryland apartment. A memorial service was held at Wootton two days later. In 2017, a bridge near the high school was named in Doran's honor.

Demographics

During the 2019–2020 school year, the school's racial composition was 41.6% white, 37.2% Asian, 8.3% Black, and 8.0% Hispanic. Multiracial students made up less than 5% of the student body, as did Native and Pacific Islander American students. The overall size of the student body was 2,116.

Notable alumni

References

External links

 

Public high schools in Montgomery County, Maryland
Schools in Rockville, Maryland
1970 establishments in Maryland
School buildings completed in 1970
Educational institutions established in 1970